Tommy Andersson may refer to:
 Tommy Andersson (actor) (1962–2013), Swedish actor
 Tommy Andersson (footballer, born 1950), Swedish footballer
 Tommy Andersson (footballer, born 1964), Swedish footballer
 Tommy Andersson (Djurgårdens IF Fotboll footballer), Swedish footballer
B. Tommy Andersson (born 1964), Swedish conductor and composer